Inmac (International Minicomputer Accessories Corporation), which became a publicly traded company, was founded in 1975 in Silicon Valley. The company was first listed on the NASDAQ in 1987 and later merged with MicroWarehouse (Currys plc) in 1996.

Inmac was founded by Ken Eldred and Jim Willenborg, who met while in the MBA program at Stanford Business School.

Inmac was the first company to sell computer-related products and accessories via direct-mail catalogs. From its initial Palo Alto, California location, Inmac expanded internationally to England (1980), Germany (1982), Sweden (1983), France (1983), the Netherlands (1984), Canada (1987), Italy (1988), and Japan (1990). By 1989, Inmac was publishing 35 million catalogs in eight different languages, as international sales accounted for more than half the company's revenue. When the company was sold to MicroWarehouse in 1996, it had 1,500 employees and annual revenue over $400 million.

In 2005, the French subsidiary, Inmac France, was sold to the French retailer Wstore and became Inmac Wstore.

References

External links 
LinkedIn Company Profile

Consumer electronics retailers in the United States
Currys plc